Seventy-Nine, also known as 79th Patient and The Asylum, is an American direct-to-video science-fiction film written and directed by Filip Maciejewicz. The film stars an ensemble cast that includes Adrian Voo, Jonathan Rosenthal and Bo Linton.

Plot
In an abandoned asylum, doctors carry out secret experiments on unsuspecting patients who have been taken from their everyday lives and seemingly erased from existence. The experiments, codenamed Limes, are designed to cure violent episodes through new methods of brainwashing and mind manipulation. But as the experimental project begins to fail, chaos ensues in the hospital as patients seek revenge against their captors.

Cast
 Adrian Voo as Isamu Tan
 Jonathan Rosenthal as Daniel Regardie
 Bo Linton as Ash Paine
 Christine Springett as Dharma Crowley
 Athena Baumeister as Hailey Dagger
 Patrick Edward Wynne as Ethan Gabriel
 Kathinka van Putten as Lily Borg
 Omar Hansen as Antero Leary
 Velta Moore as Jael Regardie
 Caroline Attwood as Sally Sanders

Release
The first trailer was released on July 7, 2013. The film held its premiere in Los Angeles on September 7, 2013. The film later opened the Louisiana Sci-fi Film and Costume Festival on April 26, 2014, also winning an accolade for 'Best Directing'. The film was released direct-to-video on February 9, 2017, in the United Kingdom, and on June 16, 2017, in the United States.

Reception
Reviewing the film, Phil Wheat of Nerdly commended the filmmakers for producing an intriguing film but noted that the film "falls completely off a cliff with bad storytelling, terrible ADR and camerawork that is horribly framed, poorly lit and uses pan and scan to show all the participants in a scene; plus the film has a ridiculously melodramatic soundtrack that is both overused and overwrought."

References

External links
 
 
 Seventy-Nine at MovieWeb

2010s mystery films
American independent films
2013 independent films
2010s science fiction films
2010s English-language films
2010s American films